Bijdragen tot de Taal-, Land- en Volkenkunde (English title: Journal of the Humanities and Social Sciences of Southeast Asia and Oceania) also known by the abbreviated name BKI (Bijdragen Koninklijk Instituut)  is a peer reviewed academic journal on Southeast Asia and Indonesia that was established in 1853 and was published by the Royal Netherlands Institute of Southeast Asian and Caribbean Studies. It was published as Bijdragen tot de taal-, land- en volkenkunde van Nederlandsch-Indië between 1853 and 1948. The journal focuses in particular on linguistics, anthropology, and history of Southeast Asia, and more specifically of Indonesia. It appears quarterly, running a total of roughly 600 pages annually. The editor-in-chief is Freek Colombijn (Vrije Universiteit).

Brill acquired the journal in 2012.

See also
 Open access in the Netherlands

References

External links 

Southeast Asian studies journals
Multilingual journals
Publications established in 1853
Open access journals
Quarterly journals
1853 establishments in the Netherlands
Anthropology journals
Brill Publishers academic journals